Kutakanna Tissa, also known as Makalan Tissa, was King of Anuradhapura in the 1st century BC, whose reign lasted from 42 BC to 20 BC. Known as the brother of king Kudatissa, Kutakanna Tissa re-established political stability and peace of the Anuradhapura kingdom by deposing queen Anula, an usurper to the Sinhalese throne. He was succeeded by his son Bhatikabhaya Abhaya.

See also
 List of Sri Lankan monarchs
 History of Sri Lanka

References

External links
 Kings & Rulers of Sri Lanka
 Codrington's Short History of Ceylon

K
K
Kutakanna
K